Titas Krapikas (born 3 January 1999) is a Lithuanian professional football who plays as a goalkeeper for Serie B club Ternana and the Lithuania national team.

Club career
Krapikas joined Italian club Sampdoria in 2015 and began playing for their Under-19 squad in the 2016–17 season. In the 2016–17 Serie A season, he also appeared on the bench for the senior squad on 22 occasions, but did not see time on the field. For the next two seasons, he mostly stayed with the junior squad, getting 11 call-ups to the senior team in total.

On 28 June 2019, he signed a three-year contract with an additional two-year extension option with Serie B club Spezia.

He made his Serie B debut for Spezia on 24 August 2019 in a game against Cittadella. He established himself as Spezia's first-choice goalkeeper early in the season before losing the starter spot to Simone Scuffet. In the 2020–21 Serie A season, he did not make any appearances in the league, with Ivan Provedel becoming the first-choice goalkeeper. Krapikas was the starter for four 2020–21 Coppa Italia games for Spezia, where the club reached the quarter-finals.

In September 2021 he signed for Ternana.

International career
Krapikas started to play in the national youth teams of Lithuania in 2015. He played three matches with the U-17 team, two of them in the qualifications of European Under-17 Championship 2016 in Azerbaijan.

The following year, he moved to the U-19 team. He remained there for two years, playing nine times, two in the qualifications of the European Under-19 Championship 2017 in Georgia and three in the European Under-19 Championship 2018 in Finland.

In 2017 he began his performance in the U-21 team. After 5 friendly matches, on 7 September 2018, he debuted in the official race. He played in the qualification and main competition of European Under-21 Championship 2019 in Italy and San Marino. In the home game in Gargždai against Georgia, where he played as a starter, the final score was 0–0.

He was first called up to the Lithuania national football team in June 2021 for friendlies. He made his debut on 15 November 2021 in a friendly against Kuwait.

References

External links
 
 UEFA
 
 lietuvosfutbolas.lt

Living people
1999 births
Sportspeople from Kaunas
Lithuanian footballers
Lithuania youth international footballers
Lithuania under-21 international footballers
Lithuania international footballers
Association football goalkeepers
U.C. Sampdoria players
Spezia Calcio players
Ternana Calcio players
Serie B players
Serie A players
Lithuanian expatriate footballers
Lithuanian expatriate sportspeople in Italy
Expatriate footballers in Italy